Moor Park and Eastbury is a ward in Three Rivers, in England.  It is located in south-west Hertfordshire, in the East of England region.  The ward includes the eponymous twin settlements of Moor Park and Eastbury, lying between Rickmansworth to the west, Croxley Green to the north, South Oxhey to the east, and Northwood to the south.

As one of the more populous wards in the district, with an electorate of 4,611, rising to 5,532 at the 2011 Census, the ward elects three members to Three Rivers District Council.  It is represented by three Conservative councillors: Debbie Morris, Reena Ranger and Joanna Clemens.  For elections to Hertfordshire County Council, part of Moor Park and Eastbury is in the Rickmansworth East and Oxhey Park division, represented by Reena Ranger, a Conservative; the remainder is in the South Oxhey and Eastbury division, represented by Christopher Alley, also a Conservative. For elections to the House of Commons, it is in the South West Hertfordshire constituency, represented by Gagan Mohindra, also of the Conservatives.

Along with Rickmansworth Town, Moor Park and Eastbury is in the Batchworth civil parish, and elects four councillors to Batchworth Community Council.

Election results

Elections in the 2020s

Elections in the 2010s

References

Wards of Hertfordshire
Politics of Three Rivers District
Geography of Three Rivers District